The Imperial Clan Court or Court of the Imperial Clan was an institution responsible for all matters pertaining to the imperial family under the Ming and Qing dynasties of imperial China. This institution also existed under the Nguyễn dynasty of Vietnam where it managed matters pertaining to the Nguyễn Phúc clan.

Established in 1389 by the Hongwu Emperor, it was based on previous institutions like the "Court of the Imperial Clan" (Zōngzhèng Sì) of the Tang and Song dynasties and the "Office of the Imperial Clan" (Tài Zōngzhèng Yuàn) of the Yuan dynasty. Under the Ming dynasty, the Court was managed by the Ministry of Rites; during the Qing, it was outside the regular bureaucracy. Under both dynasties, the Court was staffed by members of the imperial clan. Imperial clansmen who committed crimes were not tried through the regular legal system. Qing imperial clansmen were registered under the Eight Banners, but were still under the jurisdiction of the Imperial Clan Court. The Court used regular reports on births, marriages, and deaths to compile the genealogy of the imperial clan (Yùdié). The imperial genealogy was revised 28 times during the Qing dynasty.

Notes

Bibliography

.
.
.
.
.
.
.
.
.
.

 

Nine Courts
Government of the Ming dynasty
Government of the Qing dynasty